The FIL European Luge Natural Track Championships 1978 took place in Aurach, Austria.

Men's singles

Women's singles

Men's doubles

Medal table

References
Men's doubles natural track European champions
Men's singles natural track European champions
Women's singles natural track European champions

FIL European Luge Natural Track Championships
Kitzbühel District
Sport in Tyrol (state)
1978 in luge
1978 in Austrian sport
Luge in Austria
International sports competitions hosted by Austria